Alexander Salák (born January 5, 1987) is a Czech professional ice hockey goaltender. He is currently an unrestricted free agent who most recently played for Djurgårdens IF of the Swedish Hockey League (SHL). He played two games in the National Hockey League with the Florida Panthers in 2009. Internationally Salák has played for the Czech national team at three World Championships, and at the 2014 Winter Olympics.

Playing career

Czech Republic
Alexander Salák started his career in IHC Pisek and moved to HC České Budějovice organization during the 2001/02 season.

Salák played from 2002 to 2006 for Budějovice, playing in the U18 and U20 Championship leagues. During the 2005/06 season, he played 2 games for HC Strakonice, a Czech Second National League-team. In the following season, Salák spent the entire season playing for HC Tábor at the same level.

Finland
Alexander Salák was contracted to Finland in 2006, when he played for Mestis team Jokipojat on the second highest level of ice hockey in Finland. For the next season he was contracted to SM-liiga side TPS. In TPS, Salák is coached by TPS Goaltending Coach, Urpo Ylönen who has coached top Finnish goalies like Miikka Kiprusoff, Fredrik Norrena and Antero Niittymäki in the past.

National Hockey League
On May 29, 2009, Alexander Salák was signed by the Florida Panthers of the NHL. He was assigned to their AHL farm team, the Rochester Americans after training camp. He was recalled by the Panthers and made his NHL debut on October 9, 2009 in a relief role in a game against the Carolina Hurricanes. On August 13, 2010, Alexander Salák was loaned to Färjestad BK of the Swedish Elite League for the 2010-11 season.

On February 9, 2011, Salák was traded by the Panthers to the Chicago Blackhawks, along with forward Michael Frolík for Jack Skille, Hugh Jessiman, and David Pacan. On May 31, 2011, Salák was signed by the Blackhawks to a two-year contract. On June 18, 2012, the Blackhawks released Salák from his contract.

Kontinental Hockey League
He made his Kontinental Hockey League debut playing with SKA Saint Petersburg during the 2013–14 KHL season.

Career statistics

Regular season and playoffs

International

References

External links
 

1987 births
Living people
Czech ice hockey goaltenders
Dinamo Riga players
Djurgårdens IF Hockey players
Färjestad BK players
Florida Panthers players
HC Sibir Novosibirsk players
HC Sparta Praha players
HC Tábor players
HC TPS players
Ice hockey players at the 2014 Winter Olympics
Jokipojat players
Lokomotiv Yaroslavl players
Olympic ice hockey players of the Czech Republic
People from Strakonice
Rochester Americans players
Rockford IceHogs (AHL) players
SKA Saint Petersburg players
Undrafted National Hockey League players
Sportspeople from the South Bohemian Region
Czech expatriate ice hockey players in Russia
Czech expatriate ice hockey players in the United States
Czech expatriate ice hockey players in Sweden
Czech expatriate ice hockey players in Finland
Czech expatriate sportspeople in Latvia
Expatriate ice hockey players in Latvia